Gypsonoma nitidulana is a moth belonging to the family Tortricidae first described by Friederike Lienig and Philipp Christoph Zeller in 1846.

It is native to Eurasia.

References

Eucosmini